The Nova Vulgata (complete title: Nova Vulgata Bibliorum Sacrorum Editio, ; abr. NV), also called the Neo-Vulgate, is the official Classical Latin translation of the original-language texts of the Bible published by the Holy See. It was completed in 1979, and was promulgated the same year by John Paul II in Scripturarum thesaurus. A second, revised edition was published in 1986. It is the official Latin text of the Bible of the Catholic Church. The Nova Vulgata is also called the New Latin Vulgate or the New Vulgate.

Before the Nova Vulgata, the Clementine Vulgate was the standard Bible of the Catholic Church.

The Nova Vulgata is not a critical edition of the historical Vulgate. Rather, it is a text intended to accord with modern critical editions of the Hebrew and Greek Bible texts, and to produce a style closer to Classical Latin.

History

Elaboration of the text
In 1907, Pope Pius X commissioned the Benedictine Order to produce as pure a version as possible of Jerome's original text after conducting an extensive search for as-yet-unstudied manuscripts, particularly in Spain. Pope Pius XI established the Pontifical Abbey of St Jerome-in-the-City in 1933 to complete the work. 

By the 1970s, the Benedictine edition was no longer required for official purposes because of liturgical changes that had spurred the Holy See to produce a new translation of the Latin Bible, the Nova Vulgata. In consequence, the abbey was suppressed in 1984. Five monks were nonetheless allowed to complete the final two volumes of the Old Testament, which were published under the abbey's name in 1987 and 1995.

The Second Vatican Council in Sacrosanctum Concilium mandated a revision of the Latin Psalter, to bring it in line with modern textual and linguistic studies while preserving or refining its Christian Latin style. In 1965, Pope Paul VI appointed a commission to revise the rest of the Vulgate following the same principles. The Commission published its work in eight annotated sections and invited criticism from Catholic scholars as the sections were published. The Latin Psalter was published in 1969, the New Testament was completed by 1971, and the entire Nova Vulgata was published as a single-volume edition for the first time in 1979.

The foundational text of most of the Old Testament is the critical edition commissioned by Pope Pius X and produced by the monks of the Benedictine Abbey of St. Jerome. The foundational text of the Books of Tobit and Judith is from manuscripts of the Vetus Latina, rather than the Vulgate. The New Testament was based on the 1969 edition of the Stuttgart Vulgate, and hence on the Oxford Vulgate. All of these base texts were revised to accord with the modern critical editions in Greek, Hebrew, and Aramaic. A number of changes were also made where modern scholars felt that Jerome had failed to grasp the meaning of the original languages, or had rendered it obscurely.

First publication 
The NV was first published in different fascicles between 1969 and 1977.

Promulgation and publication
In 1979, after decades of preparation, the Nova Vulgata was published, and was made the official Latin version of the Bible of the Catholic Church in the apostolic constitution Scripturarum thesaurus, promulgated by Pope John Paul II on April 25, 1979. The NV was published the same year.

A second edition, published in 1986, added a Preface to the reader, an Introduction to the principles used in producing the Nova Vulgata, and an appendix containing three historical documents from the Council of Trent and the Clementine Vulgate.

Liturgiam authenticam

In 2001, the Congregation for Divine Worship and the Discipline of the Sacraments released the instruction Liturgiam authenticam. This text stated the Nova Vulgata was "the point of reference as regards the delineation of the canonical text". Concerning the translation of liturgical texts, the instruction states:
 This recommendation is qualified, however: the instruction specifies that translations should not be made from the Nova Vulgata, but rather "must be made directly from the original texts, namely the Latin, as regards the texts of ecclesiastical composition, or the Hebrew, Aramaic, or Greek, as the case may be, as regards the texts of Sacred Scripture". The instruction does not recommend translation of the Bible, or of the liturgy, based solely upon the Latin Nova Vulgata; the NV must instead simply be used as an "auxiliary tool".

When translating the Tetragrammaton, Liturgiam authenticam says that "[i]n accordance with immemorial tradition, which indeed is already evident in the above-mentioned Septuagint version, the name of almighty God expressed by the Hebrew tetragrammaton and rendered in Latin by the word Dominus, is to be rendered into any given vernacular by a word equivalent in meaning."

Textual characteristics 
Most of the approximately 2,000 changes made by the Nova Vulgata to the Stuttgart Vulgate text of Jerome's version of the Gospels are minor and stylistic in nature.

In addition, in the New Testament the Nova Vulgata introduced corrections to align the Latin with the Greek text in order to represent Jerome's text, as well as its Greek base, accurately. This alignment had not been achieved earlier, either in the edition of 1590 or in the 1592 edition of the Vulgate.

The NV contains only the Biblical canon of the Catholic Church, and not other pseudepigraphical books "often associated with the Vulgate tradition."

Use of the Nova Vulgata
William Griffin used the Nova Vulgata for his Latin-to-English translation of the Books of Tobit, Judith, 1 and 2 Maccabees, Baruch, Wisdom, Sirach, and the additions to Esther and to Daniel for the Catholic/Ecumenical Edition of The Message Bible.

The Nova Vulgata provides the Latin text of Kurt and Barbara Aland's bilingual Novum Testamentum Graece et Latine; the latter was first released in 1984. Since the Alands' 1984 revision of the Novum Testamentum Latine, that version has also used the Nova Vulgata as its reference text.

Criticism

According to Protestant university professor Benno Zuiddam, many of the NVs New Testament readings are not found in any Latin manuscripts, meaning that the NV diverges from Jerome's translation. Zuiddam has called the NV "an imaginary text of Scripture on the authority of scholarship, based on a handful of manuscripts that run contrary to the textual traditions of both the Eastern and the Western Church".

See also

 Benedictine Vulgate
 Douay–Rheims Bible
 Divino afflante Spiritu

References

External links

 Nova Vulgata Bibliorum Sacrorum Editio

Further reading

 

Editions of the Vulgate
20th-century Latin books
Catholic bibles
Documents of Pope John Paul II
20th-century Catholicism
1979 books